The Naked Truth is a 1992 comedy film starring Robert Caso and Kevin Schon. Also featured in the film are Zsa Zsa Gabor, Lou Ferrigno, Erik Estrada, Ted Lange, Billy Barty, Yvonne De Carlo, Norman Fell, Little Richard, David Birney, M. Emmet Walsh, Dick Gautier, John Vernon and Camilla Sparv among others. It is directed by Nico Mastorakis.

Plot 
A take-off on Some Like it Hot—the film follows two men who witness a murder, dress up like women to escape, and wind up hiding in the house of a drug dealer.

Release 
The movie made its premiere on Cinemax on May 3, 1993. The film did not arrive on any format until 1999, when Simitar Video released the film onto DVD. In 2003, Omega Entertainment through Image Entertainment released an extended version of the film onto DVD.

References

External links 
 

1992 films
1992 comedy films
Films directed by Nico Mastorakis